Theatre of War is a real-time tactical strategy game centering on the decisive battles in the European Theatre of World War II 1939–1945. The game allows the player to control armed forces of France, Germany, Poland, The USSR, United Kingdom or the United States (combined in actual campaign) in over 40 missions. Players will command a special task force composed of different kinds of units, including tanks, APCs, field guns, mortars, various infantry regiments and will also have an opportunity to call for artillery and air support. With a focus on unit detail and combat realism, would-be generals are faced with authentic battle scenarios, taken straight from actual World War II records and maps.

The game was developed by 1C Company and released for purchase via the Internet on April 19, 2007. It received two sequels, Theatre of War 2 and Theatre of War 3.

Reception

References

External links
 Official Theatre of War website

World War II video games
2006 video games
1C Company games
Real-time strategy video games
Windows games
Windows-only games
Video games developed in Russia
Video games set in Tunisia
Computer wargames
Multiplayer and single-player video games